La Lune ("The Moon") was the name of a nineteenth-century French weekly four-sheet newspaper edited by Francis Polo.  The illustrator André Gill became known for his work for this journal, in which he drew caricatures for a series entitled The Man of the Day.

Napoléon III disliked the portrait of him drawn by Gill.  In December 1867, the journal was censored. "La Lune will have to undergo an eclipse," an authority commented to the editor Polo when the ban was instituted, unwittingly dubbing Polo's subsequent publication: L'Éclipse, which made its first appearance on 9 August 1868.  Gill would contribute caricatures to this successor of La Lune as well.

Sources

 Covers of La Lune by André Gill
 Andre Gill
 Frères Goncourt: Gill

External links
 La Lune digitized version

1867 establishments in France
Defunct newspapers published in France
Defunct weekly newspapers
Publications disestablished in 1867
Publications with year of establishment missing
Weekly newspapers published in France